Chong Fat Full is a Malaysian politician who served as Member of the Johor State Executive Council (EXCO) in the Barisan Nasional (BN) state administration under Menteri Besar Hasni Mohammad from March 2020 to March 2022. He served as Member of Johor State Legislative Assembly (MLA) for Pemanis from May 2018 to March 2022. He is an associate member of the Malaysian United Indigenous Party (BERSATU), a component party of the ruling Perikatan Nasional (PN) coalition. He was also member of the People's Justice Party (PKR), a component party of the Pakatan Harapan (PH) opposition coalition. He was an independent who was aligned with the ruling BN coalition before joining BERSATU and after leaving PKR.

Election Results

References 

1960 births
Living people
People from Johor
Malaysian people of Chinese descent
Malaysian United Indigenous Party politicians
Former People's Justice Party (Malaysia) politicians
Members of the Johor State Legislative Assembly
Johor state executive councillors
21st-century Malaysian politicians